Blue Collar U is an American basketball team that participates in The Basketball Tournament (TBT), an annual winner-take-all single-elimination tournament. The team consists of professional basketball players, most of whom played college basketball for the Buffalo Bulls men's basketball team. The team began participating in TBT in 2021, reaching the semi-finals. Blue Collar U won its first TBT championship in its second year of participation in 2022, winning the $1 million grand prize.

History

2021
In TBT 2021, Blue Collar U played in the Columbus regional and was seeded 6th out of a field of 16 teams.

2022
In TBT 2022, Blue Collar U played in the Syracuse regional and was seeded 2nd out of a field of 8 teams. Players wore the names of the victims of the 2022 Buffalo shooting on the backs of their jerseys in place of their own names. They won the Syracuse regional with victories over NG Saints, an alumni team for Neumann Goretti High School in Philadelphia, Friday Beers, and The Nerd Team, an alumni team of Ivy League and other highly prestigious schools. After defeating Heartfire in the quarterfinals, Blue Collar U won a true road game against Red Scare, an alumni team of Dayton Flyers men's basketball. They defeated Americana for Autism in the finals to win the $1 million grand prize.

Roster

Awards

References 

Basketball teams in the United States
The Basketball Tournament teams
Basketball teams established in 2021
Buffalo Bulls men's basketball